Run To Me is a Philippine romantic comedy drama television streaming miniseries produced under the collaboration between Dreamscape Entertainment, iWantTFC, and social networking service Kumu, starring KD Estrada and Alexa Ilacad in their first main role as a loveteam. It was directed by Dwein Ruedas Baltazar.

The series premiered from May 20 to June 24, 2022 on Kumu and May 21 to June 25, 2022 on iWantTFC.

Premise
Jewel is introduced as "Ms. Perfect" and Wilson as "Mr. Perfect Son." Jewel is enjoying a successful career online, but craves for the love and affection from her mother; Wilson is struggling to make it in the digital scene for his ailing mother, yet receives all the love from her. The two cross paths in a "not-so-perfect situation" after he tries to rescue her from kidnappers. However, what he doesn't know is that it was a staged kidnap, which she planned herself. As two hearts run into each other, will they be able to find the love that they're longing for?

Cast and characters

Main cast
KD Estrada as Wilson
Alexa Ilacad as Jewel

Supporting cast
Nikki Valdez as Mami Bebot†
Mickey Ferriols as Emerald
CJ Navato as Dranreb
Malou Crisologo as Manang Bertha
Peewee O'Hara as Lola Carol
Karl Gabriel as Aion
Ivan Carapiet as Guillermo
Margaux Montaña as Vanessa
Henz Villaraiz as Pogi
Matty Juniosa as Kimba
Sean Tristan as Diamond
Haira Palaguitto as Lyn
 Alexa Macanan as Claudine
 Ross Pesigan as Boy Batak
 Jess Mendoza as Kuya Barry
 Madam Inutz as Nanet

Episodes
Kumu shows one episode first in advance before its streaming availability on iWantTFC.

Special

Official soundtrack 

The official soundtrack for the series was released on May 27, 2022, and consists of tracks mostly composed by Ilacad with contributions from Estrada and Gracenote lead vocalist Eunice Jorge including two earlier released singles "Misteryo" and "When I See You Again". All tracks except for one were composed during the pair's time in Pinoy Big Brother: Kumunity Season 10.

Just after its release, the official soundtrack ranked Number 1 in the iTunes Philippines chart, with all of its tracks placed in the Top 10 songs chart at one point.

Production

Background
Along with the announcement of Closer: the KDLex Fan Con, a new series was being teased by Dreamscape Entertainment first known as More Than Words in January 2022.

Casting
This is the first series for Ilacad and Estrada as lead actors and as a loveteam dubbed as "KDLex", where the two were part of the Celebrity Edition of Pinoy Big Brother: Kumunity Season 10 in 2021.

Marketing
A teaser was released on April 29, 2022 in the official iWantTFC YouTube channel. Its release date have to be announced. While, the full trailer was released on May 6, 2022 in the official iWantTFC YouTube channel. On May 13, 2022 a second trailer was released.

Release

Broadcast
Episodes are released for viewing through a watch party every Friday at 8:00 PM, with replays every Saturday at 10:00 AM, 1:00 PM, and 4:00 PM on the Dreamscape Entertainment account on Kumu, and be made available for streaming on iWantTFC every Saturday at 8:00 PM.

The series had its Philippine TV Premiere from September 11 to October 2, 2022 on Yes Weekend Sunday primetime on Kapamilya Channel, Kapamilya Online Live and A2Z replacing Bola Bola and was replaced by Lyric and Beat. It also aired international via TFC (The Filipino Channel).

See also
 List of programs broadcast by ABS-CBN
 List of programs distributed by ABS-CBN
 List of programs broadcast by Kapamilya Channel
 List of programs broadcast by A2Z (Philippine TV channel)
 List of iWantTFC original programming
 List of ABS-CBN drama series

References

External links
 Run To Me on iWantTFC
 

ABS-CBN drama series
IWantTFC original programming
Films based on Philippine novels
2022 Philippine television series debuts
2022 Philippine television series endings
2022 web series debuts
2022 web series endings